Be, also known as Ong Be, Bê, or Lingao (Mandarin 臨高 Lín'gāo), is a pair of languages spoken by 600,000 people, 100,000 of them monolingual, on the north-central coast of Hainan Island, including the suburbs of the provincial capital Haikou. The speakers are counted as part of the Han Chinese nationality in census. According to Ethnologue, it is taught in primary schools.

Names
Liang (1997) notes that it is similar to the autonym  (from  'person' and  'village'), by which Gelong 仡隆 (Cun language) speakers refer to themselves.

Classification
Be is a Kra–Dai language, but its precise relationship to other branches within the Kra-Dai family has yet not been conclusively determined. Hansell (1988) considers Be to be a sister of the Tai branch based on shared vocabulary, and proposes a Be–Tai grouping.

Based on toponymic evidence from place names with the prefix dya- (调 diao), Jinfang Li considers Be to have originated from the Leizhou peninsula of Guangdong province.

Weera Ostapirat (1998), analyzing data from Zhang (1992), notes that Be and Jizhao share many lexical similarities and sound correspondences, and that Jizhao may be a remnant Be-related language on the Chinese mainland.

Dialects
Be consists of the Lincheng 临城 (Western) and Qiongshan 琼山 (Eastern) dialects (Liang 1997). Liang (1997:32) documents the following varieties of Be.
Lingao County (including Lincheng 临城镇 and Xinying 新盈镇 towns)
Bailian 白莲, Chengmai County
Longtang Township 龙塘镇, Qiongshan District

Be of Chengmai is intermediate between the Lincheng and Qiongshan dialects, and has features of both (Liang 1997).

Chen (2018) contains extensive comparative lexical data for the Be dialects of Changliu (長流), Yongxing (永興), Longtang (龍塘), Qiaotou (橋頭), Huangtong (皇桐), and Xinying (新盈). The Qiaotou, Huangtong, and Xinying dialects are unintelligible with the Changliu, Yongxing, Longtang, and Shishan (石山) dialects. Chen (2018) also reconstructs Proto-Ong-Be on the basis of this comparative lexical data.

Classification
Chen (2018: 82) classifies the Ong-Be dialects into two groups, which are mutually unintelligible with each other.
Western Ong-Be
Qiaotou 橋頭
Huangtong 皇桐
Maniao 馬裊
Lincheng 臨城
Jialai 加來
Meiliang 美良
Xinying 新盈

Eastern Ong-Be
Longtang 龍塘
Longqiao 龍橋
Longquan 龍泉 (formerly Shizilu 十字路)
Yongxing 永興
Shishan 石山
Changliu 長流
Laocheng 老城

Phonology

Consonants

Initials 

  is mainly heard in finals, rarely in initials.

Finals

Vowels 

 Vowels in word-initial position are phonetically heard beginning with a glottal .
 An open-mid vowel  occurs in the Chengmai and Qiongshan dialects.
 A near-open central vowel sound  also occurs in the Qiongshan dialect.

History
Liang (1997:16) considers Be to have migrated to Hainan from the Leizhou Peninsula of Guangdong about 2,500 years ago during the Warring States Period, but not over 3,000 years ago. Liang & Zhang (1996:21–25) also believe that Be had migrated from the Leizhou Peninsula to northern Hainan about 2,500 years ago during the Warring States period.

See also
List of Proto-Ong-Be reconstructions (Wiktionary)

References

Works cited

External links
 ABVD: Ong Be word list
 Ong Be–language Swadesh vocabulary list of basic words (from Wiktionary's Swadesh-list appendix)

Kra–Dai languages
Languages of China